The 1923 Boston College Eagles football team represented Boston College an independent during the 1923 college football season. Led by ffith-year head coach Frank Cavanaugh, Boston College compiled a record of 7–1–1.

Schedule

References

Boston College
Boston College Eagles football seasons
Boston College Eagles football
1920s in Boston